Ermengol (or Armengol) III (10321065), called el de Barbastro, was the count of Urgell from 1038 to his death. He was the son of Ermengol II, Count of Urgell and his wife Velasquita "Constance", probably the daughter of Bernard I, Count of Besalú.

Life
Allied with his contemporary and second cousin Ramon Berenguer I, Count of Barcelona, together they shared in the process of erosion of the comital authority to the noblesse. They also cooperated in the Reconquista and he received a third part of the conquests, occupying, in 1050, Camarasa and Cubells after taking them from Yusuf of Lleida. In 10391040, Ermengol and Raymond Berengar signed a pact against Raymond of Cerdanya. Later in that decade, Raymond Berenger paid 20,000 solidi for Ermengol's support and military aid.

He took part in the Barbastro War of 1064 under the banner of his brother-in-law Sancho Ramírez of Aragon. When Barbastro was captured, he was given the lordship of the city. He died before 12 April 1065 defending the city from Moorish reprisals and was buried at the Monastery of San Pedro de Ager.

Marriages and issue
Ermengol married before 1048, Adelaide, who died before 1055 and whose family is not known, even if some scholars made her daughter of Guillem I, Count of Besalu. They were the parents of:
Ermengol IV, his heir;
Isabella (died ), in 10621063 married King Sancho Ramírez, who probably repudiated her in 1068, and afterwards became the third wife of William I, Count of Cerdanya. 

Before 7 May 1055, Ermengol took as his second wife Clemencia, hypothesized to have been daughter of Berengar Raymond I and his second wife Guisla (based on the names of their younger sons), by whom he had:
 Berenguer
 Guillem
 Ramon

Clemencia died after 17 October 1059, when she confirms a charter with her husband, and before 6 November 1062. Ermengol was remarried to a lady named Elvira, who died before 1063.

In 1063, Ermengol married as his fourth wife Sancha, daughter of Ramiro I of Aragon.

Ermengol III died in battle near Monzón and his body was first taken to Barbastro and then to the fortress of Àger where he was buried at the entrance of the Church of San Pedro at the Monastery of San Pedro de Àger.

Notes

References

Sources

Aurell i Cardona, Martin. "Jalons pour une enquête sur les stratégies matrimoniales des comtes Catalans (IXe-XIe s.)" Symposium internacional, 1991, vol 1, pp 281–364.
 
 
 
 
 
 
Ponsich, Pierre. "Le Conflent et ses comtes du IXe au XIIe siècle." Etudes Roussillonnaises, 1, 1951, pp 241–344.
 

1032 births
1065 deaths
Counts of Urgell
11th-century Catalan people
11th-century Visigothic people